This is a list of Swedish television related events from 2004.

Events
11 April - Johan Becker wins the third season of Fame Factory.
10 May - Carolina Gynning wins the fourth season of Big Brother Sverige.
2 September - The Swedish version of Pop Idol debuts on TV4.
26 November - Daniel Lindström wins the first season of Idol.

Debuts
2 September - Idol (2004-2011, 2013–present)

Television shows
1-24 December - Allrams höjdarpaket

2000s
Fame Factory (2002-2005)

Ending this year
Big Brother Sverige (2000-2004, 2011-2012)

Births

Deaths

See also
2004 in Sweden

References